Metaeuchromius latoides is a moth in the family Crambidae. It was described by Schouten in 1997. It is found in Turkey.

References

Crambinae
Moths described in 1997